Stephen Gregory is a Welsh author of horror fiction. He was born in Derby, England in 1952. He has a degree in law from the University of London, and has worked as a teacher in various places, including Bangor in Wales, Algiers in Algeria and the Sudan. Gregory lived in Hollywood, California for a time, where he worked as a script writer with William Friedkin at Paramount Pictures.

Works

His works include:
The Cormorant, 1986 (reissued in 2013 by Valancourt Books, new introduction by the author)
The Woodwitch, 1988 (reissued in 2014 by Valancourt Books, new introduction by Paul Tremblay)
The Blood of Angels, 1993 (reissued in 2015 by Valancourt Books, new introduction by Mark Morris)
The Perils and Dangers of This Night, 2008
The Waking that Kills, 2013
Wakening the Crow, 2014
Plague of Gulls, 2015

The Cormorant received the 1987 Somerset Maugham Award, and, in 1993, the BBC made it into a film, starring Ralph Fiennes, which won two BAFTA Cymru awards. All three books were published both in the UK and US as well as in foreign translations.

References

1952 births
Living people
Alumni of the University of London
People from Derby